St. Louis County is a county located in the Arrowhead Region of the U.S. state of Minnesota. As of the 2020 census, the population was 200,231. Its county seat is Duluth. It is the largest county in Minnesota by land area, and the largest in the United States by total area east of the Mississippi River, ahead of  Aroostook County, Maine.

St. Louis County is included in the Duluth, MN-Superior WI Metropolitan Statistical Area.

Major industries include pulpwood production and tourism. Open pit mining of taconite and processing it into high grade iron ore remains an important part of the economy of the Iron Range and is directly tied to shipping in the Twin Ports of Duluth-Superior. Parts of the federally recognized Bois Forte and Fond du Lac Indian reservations are in the county.

History
This area was long inhabited by Algonquian-speaking tribes: the Ojibwe (Chippewa), Ottawa and Potawatomi peoples were loosely affiliated in the Council of Three Fires. As American settlers entered the territory, the Native Americans were pushed to outer areas.

The Minnesota Legislature established St. Louis County on February 20, 1855, as Doty County, and changed its name to Newton County on March 3, 1855. It originally consisted of the area east and south of the St. Louis River, while the area east of the Vermilion River and north of the St. Louis River was part of Superior County.  Superior County was renamed St. Louis County.

On March 1, 1856, that St. Louis County was renamed as Lake County. Newton County was renamed as St. Louis County and had that eastern area added to it; it was also expanded westward by incorporating parts of Itasca County, which then also included most of Carlton County. On May 23, 1857, St. Louis County took its current shape when Carlton County was formed from parts of St. Louis and Pine counties.

Geography
It is the largest county in Minnesota and the largest (by total area) in the United States east of the Mississippi River.

Voyageurs National Park, established in 1975, is located in its northwestern corner, on the south shore of Rainy Lake on the Canada–US border; it is popular with water enthusiasts and fishers. The county includes parts of Superior National Forest, established in 1909, and the Boundary Waters Canoe Area Wilderness on the border, established in 1978. The BWCAW is a  wilderness area designated for fishing, camping, hiking, and canoeing, and is one of the most visited wilderness areas in the United States. St. Louis County has more than 500 lakes. The largest lakes are Pelican and Vermilion.

The "Hill of Three Waters" on the Laurentian Divide lies northeast of Hibbing. Rainfall on this hill runs to three watersheds: Hudson Bay to the north, the Gulf of Saint Lawrence to the east (via Lake Superior), or the Gulf of Mexico to the south and west (via the Mississippi River). The county is drained by the St. Louis, Vermilion, and other rivers.

Duluth on Lake Superior is one of the most important fresh-water ports in the United States.

The county encompasses part of the Iron Range. It has had a significant taconite mining industry, with active mines located in Hibbing, Mountain Iron, Eveleth, Virginia, and Babbitt, in addition to Keewatin in Itasca County.

Major highways

  Interstate Highway 35
  Interstate Highway 535 – John Blatnik Bridge
  U.S. Highway 2
  U.S. Highway 53
  U.S. Highway 169
  Minnesota State Highway 1
  Minnesota State Highway 23
  Minnesota State Highway 33
  Minnesota State Highway 37
  Minnesota State Highway 39 – McCuen Street
  Minnesota State Highway 61 – North Shore
  Minnesota State Highway 73
  Minnesota State Highway 135
  Minnesota State Highway 169
  Minnesota State Highway 194
  Minnesota State Highway 210
  St. Louis County Road 4 - Rice Lake Road
  St. Louis County Road 13 – Midway Road

Adjacent counties
 Rainy River District, Ontario, Canada (north)
 Lake County (east)
 Douglas County, Wisconsin (southeast)
 Carlton County (south)
 Aitkin County (southwest)
 Itasca County (west)
 Koochiching County (northwest)

National protected areas
 Superior National Forest (part)
 Boundary Waters Canoe Area Wilderness (part)
 Voyageurs National Park (part)

Climate and weather
The county has a humid continental climate (Köppen Dfb), slightly moderated by its proximity to Lake Superior. Winters are long, snowy, and very cold, normally seeing maximum temperatures remaining below  on 106 days. Due to global warming, in January 2019 Tracy Twine, professor at the University of Minnesota's Department of Soil, Water and Climate, said "we just don't expect temperatures to be below 10 degrees Fahrenheit in Duluth anymore." This apparent anomaly was attributed to changes in the global jet stream due to the climate change.

Demographics

2020 census

Note: the US Census treats Hispanic/Latino as an ethnic category. This table excludes Latinos from the racial categories and assigns them to a separate category. Hispanics/Latinos can be of any race.

As of the 2010 census, there were 200,226 people in the county. The racial makeup of the county was 94.0% White, 2.2% Native American, 0.4% Black or African American, 0.9% Asian, 0.2% of some other race and 2.3% of two or more races. 1.2% were Hispanic or Latino (of any race). According to the 2010–2015 American Community Survey, the ancestral makeup was 24.3% German, 15.9% Norwegian, 13.0% Swedish, and 10.2% Irish.

As of the 2000 census, there were 200,528 people, 82,619 households, and 51,389 families in the county. The population density was 32 people per square mile (12/km2). There were 95,800 housing units at an average density of 15 per square mile (6/km2). The racial makeup of the county was 94.86% White, 0.85% Black or African American, 2.03% Native American, 0.66% Asian, 0.03% Pacific Islander, 0.22% from other races, and 1.35% from two or more races. 0.80% of the population were Hispanic or Latino of any race.

27.60% of households included children under the age of 18, 49.30% were married couples living together, 9.40% had a female householder with no husband present, and 37.80% were non-families. 31.20% of all households consisted of individuals, and 13.00% of individuals 65 years of age or older. The average household size was 2.32 and the average family size was 2.90.

The population contained 22.40% under the age of 18, 11.40% from 18 to 24, 25.90% from 25 to 44, 24.30% from 45 to 64, and 16.10% who were 65 years of age or older. The median age was 39 years. For every 100 females there were 96.80 males. For every 100 females age 18 and over, there were 93.80 males.

The median income for a household in the county was $36,306, and the median income for a family was $47,134. Males had a median income of $37,934 versus $24,235 for females. The per capita income for the county was $18,982. About 7.20% of families and 12.10% of the population were below the poverty line, including 13.10% of those under age 18 and 8.90% of those age 65 or over.

Government
St. Louis County is governed by an elected and nonpartisan board of commissioners. In Minnesota, county commissions usually have five members, but St. Louis, Hennepin, and Ramsey counties have seven-member boards. Each commissioner represents a single-member district of equal population.

The county commission elects a chair who presides at meetings.

Commissioners as of January 2023:

Politics

In 2007, St. Louis County considered doing a study about dividing into two counties, but the proposal was not acted on.

This county is one of the most reliably Democratic counties in the state, as no Republican or Independent candidate has won the county in a statewide election since 1992. The only time a Democrat obtained less than 50% of the vote was in 1998, when Jesse Ventura of the Reform ticket won statewide; some 24% of the county voted for him. Since 1992, the only time when a Republican obtained more than 34% of the vote was in the elections of 1994 (year of Republican Revolution) when the incumbent Independent-Republican governor won the statewide vote by a landslide of more than 60%, and when the Independent-Republican senatorial candidate won election with 49% statewide, both of which are rare occurrences in Minnesota.

Presidential elections
St. Louis County has long been one of the strongest Democratic bastions in the state outside of the Twin Cities. The Democrats have carried the county for 23 consecutive presidential elections; the last Republican candidate to carry the county was Herbert Hoover in 1928, before the Great Depression. In recent elections, Republicans have received about 1/3rd of the county's vote. In 2016, Donald Trump earned 39.7% of the county's vote, while the Democratic vote deteriorated to 51.4% (the lowest percentage since 1932); according to exit polls, this was due to residents' concerns about the decline of mining and forestry in the county. This was the closest that a Republican had come to winning the county since 1932. In 2020, Trump became the first Republican since Herbert Hoover to get more than 40% of the vote in St. Louis County, but Joe Biden bolstered the Democratic margin of victory from 11.7% to 15.6%.

Congress
St. Louis County is in Minnesota's 8th congressional district. For 36 years it was represented by Democrat Jim Oberstar. He was defeated in 2010 by Republican Chip Cravaack. Two years later Cravaack was defeated by Democrat Rick Nolan, who represented the district until his retirement in 2019.  Republican St. Louis County commissioner Pete Stauber succeeded Nolan in one of three Democrat-to-Republican district flips in 2018, two of which happened in Minnesota.

Communities

Cities

 Aurora
 Babbitt
 Biwabik
 Brookston
 Buhl
 Chisholm
 Cook
 Duluth (county seat)
 Ely
 Eveleth
 Floodwood
 Gilbert
 Hermantown
 Hibbing
 Hoyt Lakes
 Iron Junction
 Kinney
 Leonidas
 McKinley
 Meadowlands
 Mountain Iron
 Orr
 Proctor
 Rice Lake
 Tower
 Virginia
 Winton

Townships

 Alango Township
 Alborn Township
 Alden Township
 Angora Township
 Arrowhead Township
 Ault Township
 Balkan Township
 Bassett Township
 Beatty Township
 Biwabik Township
 Breitung Township
 Brevator Township
 Camp 5 Township
 Canosia Township
 Cedar Valley Township
 Cherry Township
 Clinton Township
 Colvin Township
 Cotton Township
 Crane Lake Township
 Culver Township
 Duluth Township
 Eagles Nest Township
 Ellsburg Township
 Elmer Township
 Embarrass Township
 Fairbanks Township
 Fayal Township
 Field Township
 Fine Lakes Township
 Floodwood Township
 Fredenberg Township
 French Township
 Gnesen Township
 Grand Lake Township
 Great Scott Township
 Greenwood Township
 Halden Township
 Industrial Township
 Kabetogama Township
 Kelsey Township
 Kugler Township
 Lakewood Township
 Lavell Township
 Leiding Township
 Linden Grove Township
 McDavitt Township
 Meadowlands Township
 Midway Township
 Morcom Township
 Morse Township
 Ness Township
 New Independence Township
 Normanna Township
 North Star Township
 Northland Township
 Owens Township
 Pequaywan Township
 Pike Township
 Portage Township
 Prairie Lake Township
 Sandy Township
 Solway Township
 Stoney Brook Township
 Sturgeon Township
 Toivola Township
 Van Buren Township
 Vermilion Lake Township
 Waasa Township
 White Township
 Willow Valley Township
 Wuori Township

Unorganized territories

 Angleworm Lake
 Bear Head Lake
 Birch Lake
 Camp A Lake
 Crab Lake
 Dark River
 Gheen
 Hay Lake
 Heikkala Lake
 Hush Lake
 Janette Lake
 Leander Lake
 Linwood Lake
 Marion Lake
 McCormack
 Mud Hen Lake
 Nett Lake
 Northeast St. Louis
 Northwest St. Louis
 Pfeiffer Lake
 Picket Lake
 Potshot Lake
 Sand Lake
 Slim Lake
 Sturgeon River
 Sunday Lake
 Tikander Lake
 Whiteface Reservoir

Census-designated places
 Mahnomen
 Nett Lake
 Soudan

Unincorporated communities

 Alborn
 Angora
 Ash Lake
 Bassett
 Bear River
 Bengal
 Brimson
 Britt
 Burnett
 Burntside
 Buyck
 Canyon
 Celina
 Central Lakes
 Cherry
 Clover Valley
 Cotton
 Crane Lake
 Culver
 Cusson
 Eldes Corner
 Elmer
 Embarrass
 Fairbanks
 Florenton
 Forbes
 Four Corners
 French River
 Gheen
 Gheen Corner
 Glendale
 Gowan
 Greaney
 Idington
 Independence
 Island Lake
 Kabetogama
 Keenan
 Kelsey
 Linden Grove
 Makinen
 Markham
 McComber
 Meadow Brook
 Melrude
 Munger
 Palmers
 Palo
 Payne
 Peary
 Petrel
 Peyla
 Pineville
 Prosit
 Ramshaw
 Robinson
 Rollins
 Saginaw
 Sax
 Shaw
 Sherman Corner
 Side Lake
 Silica
 Simar
 Skibo
 Sturgeon
 Taft
 Toivola
 Twig
 Vermilion Dam
 Wahlsten
 Wakemup
 Whiteface
 Wolf
 Zim

Ghost towns
 Carson Lake
 Costin Village
 Elcor
 Fermoy
 Spina

See also
 National Register of Historic Places listings in St. Louis County, Minnesota
 Independent School District 2142

References

External links
 St. Louis County Government site – Link
 Duluth News Tribune site
 Mn/DOT maps of St. Louis County (Southwest portion, West–Central portion, Southeast portion, East–Central portion, Northern part of West–Central portion, Northwest portion, Northeast portion)

 
St. Louis County, Minnesota
1855 establishments in Minnesota Territory
Populated places established in 1855